Vadim Moiseenko (born 7 July 1994) is a Russian chess grandmaster (2011).

Biography
Vadim Moiseenko started playing chess at the age of five. He is Vologda student of chess school. In 2001, he took second place in the Russian Youth Chess Championship in U8 age group behind winner Daria Voit. In the following years, Vadim Moiseenko occasionally participated in chess tournament, but in 2012 Prague represented Russia in European Youth Chess Championship in the U18 age group, where he became a winner. In 2012, he started studying in Saint Petersburg and less time left for chess. Vadim Moiseenko has successfully participated in Finland International Chess Tournament Heart of Finland, where he was third in 2014, won in 2016, and took second place in 2017. In 2016, he was second in the Russian Student Chess Championship and won third place in the Russian Fast Chess Championship. In 2017, in Kazan Vadim Moiseenko won the Rashid Nezhmetdinov memorial.

In 2013, Vadim Moiseenko was awarded the FIDE International Master (IM) title and received the FIDE Grandmaster (GM) title five year later. He has also been working as a youth chess coach since 2016.

References

External links

Vadim Moiseenko chess games at 365Chess.com

1994 births
Living people
Russian chess players
Chess grandmasters